Corell is a surname. Notable people with the surname include:

 Antonio Corell (born 1950), Spanish former swimmer
 Hans Corell (born 1939), Swedish lawyer and diplomat
 Robert Corell (born 1934), American global climate scientist

See also
Correll (disambiguation)
Corel, Canadian software company